"On the Road Again" is a song recorded by the American blues-rock group Canned Heat in 1967.  A driving blues-rock boogie, it was adapted from earlier blues songs and includes mid-1960s psychedelic rock elements. Unlike most of Canned Heat's songs from the period which were sung by Bob Hite, second guitarist and harmonica player Alan Wilson provides the distinctive falsetto vocal. "On the Road Again" first appeared on their second album, Boogie with Canned Heat, in January 1968; when an edited version was released as a single in April 1968, "On the Road Again" became Canned Heat's first record chart hit and one of their best-known songs.

Earlier songs
With his record company's encouragement, Chicago blues musician Floyd Jones recorded a song titled "On the Road Again" in 1953.  It was a remake of his successful 1951 song "Dark Road". Both songs are based on Mississippi Delta bluesman Tommy Johnson's 1928 song "Big Road Blues" (Canned Heat took their name from Johnson's 1928 song "Canned Heat Blues").  Johnson's lyrics include: "Well I ain't goin' down that big road by myself ... If I don't carry you gonna carry somebody else".  Jones "reshaped Tommy Johnson's verses into an eerie evocation of the Delta". In "Dark Road" he added:

And in "On the Road Again" he added

Both songs share a "hypnotic one-chord drone piece"-arrangement that one-time Floyd Jones musical partner Howlin' Wolf used for his songs "Crying at Daybreak" and the related "Smokestack Lightning".

Recording and composition
"On the Road Again" was among the first songs Canned Heat recorded as demos in April 1967 at the RCA Studios in Chicago with original drummer Frank Cook.  At over seven minutes in length, it has the basic elements of the later album version, but is two minutes longer with more harmonica and guitar soloing.

During the recording for their second album, Canned Heat recorded "On the Road Again" with new drummer Adolfo "Fito" de la Parra. The session took place September 6, 1967, at the Liberty Records studio in Los Angeles.  Alan Wilson used verses from Floyd Jones' "On the Road Again" and "Dark Road" and added some lines of his own:

For the instrumental accompaniment, Canned Heat uses a "basic E/G/A blues chord pattern" or "one-chord boogie riff" adapted from John Lee Hooker's 1949 hit "Boogie Chillen'".  Expanding on Jones' hypnotic drone, Wilson used an Eastern string instrument called a tambura to give the song a psychedelic ambience. Although Bob Hite was the group's primary vocalist, "On the Road" features Wilson as the singer, "utilizing his best Skip James-inspired falsetto vocal". Wilson also provides the harmonica parts.

The basic riff is used again by Canned Heat on "Fried Hockey Boogie", an eleven-minute boogie by Larry Taylor which showcases the band's musicality with a series of virtuoso solo performances by members.

Personnel
 Alan Wilson – vocal, harmonica, electric guitar, tambura
 Henry Vestine – electric guitar
 Larry Taylor – bass guitar
 Adolfo de la Parra – drums

Releases and charts
"On the Road Again" is included on Canned Heat's second album, Boogie with Canned Heat, released January 21, 1968, by Liberty Records.  After receiving strong response from airplay on American "underground" FM radio, Liberty issued the song as a single on April 24, 1968.   To make the song more Top-40 AM radio-friendly, Liberty edited it from the original length of 4:55 to a 3:33 single version.  It became Canned Heat's first single to appear in the record charts.

On the singles, Floyd Jones and Alan Wilson are listed as the composers, while the album credits Jim Oden/James Burke Oden (also known as St. Louis Jimmy Oden).  "On the Road Again" appears on several Canned Heat compilation albums, including Let's Work Together: The Best of Canned Heat (1989) and Uncanned! The Best of Canned Heat (1994).  Also, it is featured on the soundtrack to Wim Wenders 1974 film Alice in the Cities.

Influence
Although songs inspired by John Lee Hooker's "Detroit-era boogie" had been recorded over the years by a variety of blues musicians, Canned Heat's "On the Road Again" popularized the guitar-boogie or E/G/A riff in the rock world.  As a result, "it's been a standard rock and roll pattern ever since".  Canned Heat used it frequently as the starting point for several of their extended jam songs, including the 40 minute live opus "Refried Boogie (Part I & II)" from their late 1968 Living the Blues album.  When Hooker recorded an updated version of "Boogie Chillen'", titled "Boogie Chillen No. 2", with the group in 1970 for Hooker 'n Heat, it had come full circle.

Notes
Footnotes

Citations

References

 
Songs about roads
1968 singles
Blues songs
Canned Heat songs
1967 songs
Liberty Records singles
Katie Melua songs

sv:On the Road Again